2004 Lexell, provisional designation , is a stony Florian asteroid from the inner regions of the asteroid belt, approximately 7.5 kilometers in diameter. The asteroid was discovered on 22 September 1973, by Soviet astronomer Nikolai Chernykh at the Crimean Astrophysical Observatory in Nauchnij, on the Crimean peninsula, and later named for Swedish-Russian astronomer and mathematician Anders Johan Lexell.

Classification and orbit 

Lexell is a member of the Flora family, one of the largest collisional populations of stony asteroids. It orbits the Sun at a distance of 2.0–2.3 AU once every 3 years and 2 months (1,169 days). Its orbit has an eccentricity of 0.08 and an inclination of 2° with respect to the ecliptic.

Physical characteristics 

Pan-STARRS photometric survey characterized Lexell as a LS-type asteroid, which transitions between the common S-type and rare L-type asteroid.

Rotation period 

In March 2013, two rotational lightcurves of Lexell were obtained from photometric observations by Gary Haagen at Stonegate Observatory, Massachusetts, and by a group of astronomers at the Oakley Southern Sky Observatory, Australia. Lightcurve analysis gave a well-defined rotation period of 5.441 and 5.4429 hours with a brightness variation of 0.45 and 0.42 magnitude, respectively.

In February 2013, observations made by French amateur astronomer Pierre Antonini gave a concurring period of 5.44 hours with an amplitude of 0.51 magnitude.

Diameter and albedo 

According to the survey carried out by the NEOWISE mission of NASA's Wide-field Infrared Survey Explorer, Lexell measures 7.255 and 7.456 kilometers in diameter and its surface has an albedo of 0.306 and 0.2908, respectively. The Collaborative Asteroid Lightcurve Link assumes an albedo of 0.24 – derived from 8 Flora, the largest member and namesake of the Flora family – and calculates a diameter of 7.82 kilometers based on an absolute magnitude of 12.7.

Naming 

This minor planet was named after Anders Johan Lexell (1740–1784), a Swedish-Russian astronomer and mathematician. The official  was published by the Minor Planet Center on 15 October 1977. The lunar crater Lexell was also named in his honor, as is Lexell's Comet, of which he computed its orbit.

References

External links 
 Asteroid Lightcurve Database (LCDB), query form (info )
 Dictionary of Minor Planet Names, Google books
 Asteroids and comets rotation curves, CdR – Observatoire de Genève, Raoul Behrend
 Discovery Circumstances: Numbered Minor Planets (1)-(5000) – Minor Planet Center
 
 

002004
Discoveries by Nikolai Chernykh
Named minor planets
19730922